"Show & Prove" is a single and posse cut from the Big Daddy Kane album Daddy's Home. The song was produced by DJ Premier, and features guest verses from Scoob Lover, Sauce Money, Shyheim, Ol' Dirty Bastard, and a then unknown Jay-Z. Though the single did not top charts, it did receive moderate acclaim, most notably from AllMusic's John Bush, who called the song "irresistible" and praised Jay-Z's fast-paced raps.

Samples
"Show & Prove" features vocal samples of Slick Rick from the song "The Show" by Doug E. Fresh featuring Slick Rick. In one verse Slick Rick says "Bust a move we 'Show & Prove'". That line was used in the intro to this song. It also contains a sample of the Grover Washington Jr. song "Black Frost".

Music video
The music video (directed by Lionel C. Martin) contains all seven rappers, as well as Slick Rick (in the beginning) and the Killa Beez (including Busta Rhymes), and Junior M.A.F.I.A. at an unknown location in what seems to be a New York City park.

Notes

Big Daddy Kane songs
Jay-Z songs
Ol' Dirty Bastard songs
Song recordings produced by DJ Premier
Songs written by DJ Premier
Songs written by Slick Rick
1994 songs
Songs written by Jay-Z
Posse cuts
Songs written by Big Daddy Kane